Austrominius is a genus of barnacles belonging to the family Elminiidae.

The species of this genus are found in Europe and Australia.

Species:

Austrominius adelaidae 
Austrominius covertus 
Austrominius erubescens 
Austrominius flindersi 
Austrominius modestus 
Austrominius placidus

References

Austrobalanidae
Maxillopoda genera